Dev Raj Ghimire is a Nepalese politician, currently serving as the Speaker of the House of Representatives of Nepal since 19 January 2023.  Ghimire is a  member of the 2nd Federal Parliament of Nepal. In the 2022 Nepalese general election, he won the election from Jhapa 2 (constituency). He is also a standing committee member of the CPN (UML).

References

Living people
Nepal MPs 2022–present
1956 births